Investors in Bernard L. Madoff Investment Securities LLC lost billions of dollars in the Madoff investment scandal, a Ponzi scheme fraud conducted by Bernard Madoff. The amount missing from client accounts, over two thirds of which were fabricated gains, was almost $65 billion. The court-appointed trustee Irving Picard estimated actual losses to investors of $18 billion, and much of that money has been returned.

The 162-page list of clients (without investment amount), filed in U.S. Bankruptcy Court in Manhattan, was made public on February 4, 2009.  Some of the clients profited. Thousands of individual investors of Fairfield Greenwich, J. Ezra Merkin's Ascot Partners, and Chais Investments are not included.

Several newspapers and news services, including Bloomberg News, The New York Times, and The Wall Street Journal, compiled lists of these investors during the first few months of the scandal, including fabricated gains in the amounts lost. These lists may include double-counting; for example, they may count investments by feeder funds into Madoff Securities, as well as  investments made into the feeder funds.

References

External links
 List of banks, individuals, and charities who claimed losses due to Madoff, and dollar amount lost, at The New York Times (Retrieved January 24, 2009)
  | Last updated March 2009

2008 in economics
Madoff investment scandal

Finance lists
Lists of victims of crimes